These are the official results of the Men's Decathlon competition at the 1997 World Championships in Athens, Greece. There were a total number of 34 participating athletes, including fourteen non-finishers. The competition started on August 5, 1997, and ended on August 6, 1997. At over 41%, this edition of the men's decathlon is notable for having the highest fraction of athletes not finishing the competition in the World Championships history. This was equalled 20 years later during the 2017 World Championships in Athletics.

Medalists

Schedule

Tuesday, August 5

Wednesday, August 6

Records

Results

See also
 1996 Men's Olympic Decathlon
 1997 Hypo-Meeting
 1997 Decathlon Year Ranking
 1998 Men's European Championships Decathlon

References
 Results
 decathlon2000

D
Decathlon at the World Athletics Championships